Red Hill Pass is a mountain pass in Gila County, Arizona. It has an elevation of 3,218 ft (981 m) and is located near the city of Globe.

References

Landforms of Gila County, Arizona
Mountain passes of Arizona